The Bath may refer to:
The Bath (play), a 1701 comedy play by Thomas d'Urfey
The Bath (EP), by electronica duo Lemon Jelly
The Child's Bath, a painting by Mary Cassatt (also known as The Bath)
The Bath (short story), a short story by Raymond Carver
Le Déjeuner sur l’herbe, originally titled Le Bain ("The Bath"), a painting by Édouard Manet

See also
Bath (disambiguation)